Glyphodes boseae is a moth of the family Crambidae. It was described by Max Saalmüller in 1880 and it is found in Madagascar.

This species has ochreous-yellow forewings, dusted with brown-and-black scales at the edges and in the middle. It has four pearl coloured cellspots. The hindwings are translucent pearlish yellowish with a dark brown shine in the middle. The body is ochreous brown. The wingspan of this species is about 14 mm.

References

Moths described in 1880
Glyphodes
Moths of Madagascar
Moths of Africa